Temnostoma ruptizona is a species of syrphid fly in the family Syrphidae.

Distribution
China.

References

Eristalinae
Insects described in 2012
Diptera of Asia